Dads and Kids is a Canadian documentary film, directed by Christian Bruyère and released in 1986. The film examines the relationships of single fathers with their children after separation or divorce.

The film won the Genie Award for Best Feature Length Documentary at the 8th Genie Awards.

References

External links
 

1986 films
1986 documentary films
Canadian documentary films
Best Documentary Film Genie and Canadian Screen Award winners
1980s English-language films
1980s Canadian films